The Calvi class was a class of three submarines built by Oderno-Terni-Orlando in Genoa for the Royal Italian Navy. The submarines were built in 1935, and all three served in the Mediterranean at the start of the Second World War. The boats were transferred to the BETASOM Atlantic submarine base at Bordeaux in August 1940.  In December 1941 the boats were used for a rescue mission of 254 sailors from the sunken .  After Calvi had been sunk, Finzi and Tazzoli were selected for conversion to "transport submarines" in order to exchange rare or irreplaceable trade goods with Japan.  Cargo capacity of 160 tons reduced reserve buoyancy from 20–25% to 3.5–6%; and armament was reduced to defensive machine guns.

Design and description
The Calvi class was an improved and enlarged version of the preceding  submarine cruisers. They displaced  surfaced and  submerged. Their crew numbered 77 officers and enlisted men.

For surface running, the boats were powered by two  diesel engines, each driving one propeller shaft. When submerged each propeller was driven by a  electric motor. They could reach  on the surface and  underwater.

The boats were armed with eight  torpedo tubes, four each in the bow and in the stern for which they carried a total of 16 torpedoes. They were also armed with a pair of  deck guns, one each fore and aft of the conning tower, for combat on the surface. Their anti-aircraft armament consisted of two twin-gun mounts for  machine guns.

Ships

Pietro Calvi
Pietro Calvi (pennant number CV) was launched 31 March 1935. During the Spanish Civil War, she unsuccessfully fired a pair of torpedoes each at the  mail steamer  and the 3946  mail steamer  during a patrol on 1–17 January 1937. During the night of 12/13 January she bombarded the port of Valencia.

The first patrol during the Second World War was from Liguria to the Atlantic Ocean, and lasted from 3 July to 6 August 1940.  After overhaul at La Spezia, Calvi sailed on 6 October 1940 for a second Atlantic patrol reaching Bordeaux on 23 October.  Calvi suffered storm damage during its third patrol off the British Isles from 3 to 31 December 1940.  The fourth patrol was between the Canary Islands and the Azores from 31 March to 13 May 1941.  Calvi sailed on 1 August 1941 for a fifth patrol off the Canary Islands.  During the sixth patrol from 7 to 29 December 1941 Calvi, Finzi and Tazzoli rescued sailors of the sunken raider Atlantis.  The seventh patrol was off Brazil from 7 March to 29 April 1942.  Calvi sailed on 2 July 1942 for its eighth patrol.  Calvi was rammed and sunk on 14 July 1942 by convoy SL 115 escort .  Three officers and 32 sailors survived.

Giuseppe Finzi
Giuseppe Finzi (pennant number FZ) was launched 29 June 1935. The first war patrol was from Cagliari to the Atlantic, and lasted from 5 June to 10 July 1940.  The submarine sailed on 7 September 1940 and passed the Strait of Gibraltar on 13 September for an Atlantic patrol to Bordeaux, France, on 29 September. Admiral Karl Dönitz visited Giuseppe Finzi on 30 September to welcome  sailors to the German base. The third patrol near the British Isles from 24 October to 4 December 1940 revealed that the diesel engine air intake was too exposed for North Atlantic winter weather.  The fourth patrol was near the Canary Islands from 10 March to 17 April 1941 and the fifth patrol was off Gibraltar in August. During the sixth patrol from 7 to 29 December 1941 , Giuseppe Finzi and  rescued sailors of the sunken German commerce raider . The submarine sailed for Operation Neuland on 6 February 1942 and returned on 31 March. She returned to the Caribbean Sea for an eighth patrol from 6 June to 18 August 1942. On 26 November 1942 Giuseppe Finzi sailed for a ninth patrol to Brazil; but mechanical problems required return to base on 10 December. The boat patrolled the West African coast from 11 February to 18 April 1943. Conversion to a transport submarine was never completed, and the boat was seized by the Germans on 9 September 1943 when Italy surrendered to the Allies. Renamed UIT21 in German service, she was scuttled at Le Verdon-sur-Mer on 25 August 1944 to prevent her capture by advancing Allied forces.

Enrico Tazzoli

Enrico Tazzoli (pennant number TZ) was launched 14 October 1935. It was named after Enrico Tazzoli, a martyr of the Italian wars of independence. The first wartime patrol was off the coast of North Africa from 21 June to 2 July 1940. The second was an unsuccessful attempt to pass the Strait of Gibraltar from 30 July to 9 August 1940. After overhaul at La Spezia, Enrico Tazzoli sailed on 2 October 1940 and passed the Strait of Gibraltar on 7 October for an Atlantic patrol to Bordeaux on 24 October. The fourth patrol was off the British Isles from 13 December 1940 to 6 January 1941. The boat sailed on 7 April 1941 to patrol between Freetown and the Azores; and shot down an attacking Bristol Blenheim while returning to port on 23 May. The sixth patrol was again off Freetown from 15 July to 11 September 1941. During the seventh patrol from 7 to 27 December 1941 ,  and Tazzoli rescued sailors of the sunken German commerce raider . The submarine sailed for Operation Neuland on 2 February 1942 and returned on 31 March. The ninth patrol was again to the Caribbean from 18 June to 5 September 1942; and the tenth patrol was to Brazil from 14 November 1942 to 2 February 1943. After conversion to a transport submarine, Enrico Tazzoli sailed for Japan on 16 May 1943 and was sunk by aircraft in the Bay of Biscay on 23 May.

See also
 Italian submarines of World War II

References

Notes

Sources

External links
 Classe Pietro Calvi Marina Militare website

Submarine classes
 
Submarines of the Regia Marina
Ships built by OTO Melara